Rhyd is a small village in the Welsh County of Gwynedd, located on the B4410 road, halfway between Maentwrog and Llanfrothen. Situated on an elevated site within the Snowdonia National Park, the village has views of the Moelwyns, notably Moelwyn Bach. The village is located one mile from Tan-y-Bwlch railway station, one of the principal stops on the historic Ffestiniog Railway. Nearby is Llyn Mair.

External links 

www.geograph.co.uk : photos of Rhyd and surrounding area

Villages in Gwynedd
Villages in Snowdonia
Llanfrothen